Ifeoma Ozoeze (born 13 August 1971) is an Italian former heptathlete.

Career
She finished fifteenth at the 1991 World Championships and eighth at the 1992 European Indoor Championships. In 1995, Ozoeze won a scholarship to University of California, Berkeley: she won the Pac-10 Conference the same year.

Personal life 
Ozoeze's father is a Nigerian gynecologist, her Italian mother Silvana Collodo was the president of the Faculty of Literature and Philosophy of Padua.

Ozoeze was arrested in 2008 for extortion, and was placed in the women's prison of Venice. During her time in prison, she published a book titled "Perché".

Achievements

National titles
Ifeoma Ozoeze has won one time the individual national championship.
1 win in Eptathlon (1990)

See also
 Italian all-time lists - Heptathlon

Bibliography

References

External links
 

1971 births
Living people
Italian female pentathletes
Italian heptathletes
Italian people of Nigerian descent
Italian sportspeople of African descent
World Athletics Championships athletes for Italy